The Thoughts of Emerlist Davjack is the 1968 debut album by the English psychedelic rock and progressive rock group the Nice.

Background
The name Emerlist Davjack is a portmanteau created by combining the last names of the four members of the group; Keith Emerson, [[David O'List|David OList]], Brian Davison and Lee Jackson. The original disc credits all compositions to "Emerlist Davjack"; later releases gave more specific credits. According to O’List, Mick Jagger was originally planned to produce the album, but was unable to do so. Engineering duties were undertaken by Glyn Johns, who contributed echo effects to “Flower King Of Flies”, also sung by O’List.

At the 1967 Windsor Jazz & Blues Festival, lead singer Jackson said the song "Flower King of Flies" was about Paul McCartney. "The Thoughts of Emerlist Davjack" was used as incidental music for the 1968 children's television drama "The Tyrant King", directed by Mike Hodges and written by Trevor Preston for Thames Television, from the London Transport book by Aylmer Hall. The 6-part series also featured music by the Rolling Stones, the Moody Blues and Pink Floyd.

"Rondo" includes a short excerpt from Johann Sebastian Bach's Toccata & Fugue in D Minor, as well as an extended quote and re-harmonization of the Dave Brubeck Quartet's "Blue Rondo à la Turk". "The Cry of Eugene", which was later re-recorded by Jackson's group Jackson Heights, refers to "Harlequin & Columbine".

The album was promoted by a sampler (featured on the Castle Communications 2000 box set "Here Come The Nice" (CMETD 055-1)) featuring a commentary by John Peel, which included the following comments:1967 was a strange year for pop music with groups experimenting with new sounds and bouncing on and off bandwagons with dizzying speed and agility. They were calling themselves ridiculous names and regretting it shortly. The Nice came together in a void and will be here when the others are in pantomime in Wolverhampton.

The cover, photographed by Gered Mankowitz, shows members of the band shirtless, wrapped in cellophane.

Legacy

The album was named as one of Classic Rock magazines "50 Albums That Built Prog Rock".

Track listing
Side one
"Flower King of Flies" (Keith Emerson, Lee Jackson) – 3:19
"The Thoughts of Emerlist Davjack"  (Emerson, David O'List) – 2:49
"Bonnie K" (Jackson, O'List) – 3:24
"Rondo" (Dave Brubeck, Emerson, O'List, Brian Davison, Jackson) – 8:22

Side two
"War and Peace" (Emerson, O'List, Davison, Jackson) – 5:13
"Tantalising Maggie" (Emerson, Jackson) – 4:35
"Dawn" (Davison, Emerson, Jackson) – 5:17
"The Cry of Eugene" (Emerson, Jackson, O'List) – 4:36

Bonus tracks on 1999 Repertoire reissue
"The Thoughts of Emerlist Davjack" (single version) (Emerson, O'List) – 2:48
"Azrial (Angel of Death)" (Emerson, Jackson) – 3:44
"America" [instrumental] (Leonard Bernstein, Stephen Sondheim, Emerlist Davjack) – 6:18
"The Diamond Hard Blue Apples of the Moon" (Davison, Jackson) – 2:47
"America" (US Single Edit) (Bernstein, Sondheim, Emerlist Davjack) – 3:55

Bonus tracks on 2003 Castle Music Deluxe Edition
"Promo 7″ Sampler For Album" – 5:15
"Azrial (Angel Of Death)" – 3:43
"The Thoughts of Emerlist Davjack" (mono single) – 2:47
"The Diamond Hard Blue Apples Of The Moon" – 2:46
"America/Second Amendment" – 6:19

CD 2
"Flower King Of Flies" (alt. Autumn 67 version/mix) – 3:35
"Bonnie K" (alt. Autumn '67 version) – 3:19
"Dawn" (alt. Autumn '67 version) – 5:04
"Tantalising Maggie" (alt. version) – 4:22
"The Cry of Eugene" (alt. Autumn '67 version) – 4:30
"The Thoughts of Emerlist Davjack" (ext. alt. Autumn '67 version) – 4:12
"Daddy, Where Did I Come From?" (alt. version) – 2:46
"America Second Amendment" (alt. Stereo version) – 6:14
"Sombrero Sam" (BBC session, October 26, 1967) – 3:32
"Get to You" (BBC session, June 16, 1968) – 3:40
"The Diamond Hard Blue Apples of the Moon" (BBC session, June 16, 1968) – 2:55
"Brandenburger" (BBC session, June 16, 1968) – 3:49
"Little Arabella (And Sorcery)" (BBC session, June 16, 1968) – 3:39

Bonus tracks on 2004 Fuel 2000 reissue
"The Thoughts of Emerlist Davjack" (extended version) – 4:12
"Flower King of Flies" (alt. version) – 3:36
"Azrael (Angel of Death)" (single B =-side) – 3:43
"America" (single version) – 6:06
"America/Second Amendment" (ext. version) – 6:23
"Diamond-Hard Blue Apples of the Moon" (single B-side) – 2:45
"Daddy, Where Did I Come From?" (early version) – 2:46
Note: tracks #12 & 13 are reversed from label order, with track #12 running 6:18 and track # 13 running 6:06

Personnel 
Source:

The Nice 
Keith Emerson – organ, piano, harpsichord, vocals
Lee Jackson – bass, guitar, vocals, timpani
David O'List – guitar, trumpet, vocals (lead vocals on “Flower King of Flies”)
Brian Davison – drums, tubular bells, timpani
with:
Billy Nicholls – uncredited harmony vocals on "Thoughts of Emerlist Davjack"

Technical 
Derek Burton and Gered Mankowitz – cover design

References

External links 
 

1968 debut albums
The Nice albums
Immediate Records albums